Herbert M. Hamblen (December 12, 1905 – January 6, 1994) was an American politician in the state of Washington. He served in the Washington House of Representatives from 1943 to 1949. He was Speaker of the House from 1947 to 1949.

References

1994 deaths
1905 births
Republican Party members of the Washington House of Representatives
20th-century American politicians